John Louis of Isenburg-Offenbach (German: Johann Ludwig von Isenburg-Offenbach, 14 February 1622 — 23 February 1685) was the Count Isenburg-Offenbach from 1635 until 1685, and the co-Count of Isenburg-Birstein from 1641 until 1685.

John Louis married Louise, daughter of Louis Henry, Prince of Nassau-Dillenburg, on 10 February 1646. They had five children:
 Sophie Elizabeth (1650 — 1692)
 Charlotte Amalie (1651 — 1725)
 Johann Philipp (1655 — 1718), count of Isenburg-Offenbach
 Wilhelm Moritz (1657 — 1711), count of Isenburg-Birstein
 Christiane (1660 — 1710)

1685 deaths
John Louis
Year of birth unknown